Elections to Trafford Council were held on 3 May 2012. One third of the council was up for election, with each successful candidate serving a four-year term of office, expiring in 2016. The Conservative Party held overall control of the council.

The current composition of the Council is as follows:

Election results

Ward results

The results for individual wards in the Election are as follows:

Altrincham ward

Ashton upon Mersey ward

Bowdon ward

Broadheath ward

Brooklands ward

Bucklow-St. Martins ward
Cllr. Ian Platt left the Labour Party in late 2015 and served the remainder of his term in office as an Independent councillor.

Clifford ward

Davyhulme East ward

Davyhulme West ward

Flixton ward

Gorse Hill ward

Hale Barns ward

Hale Central ward

Longford ward

Priory ward

Sale Moor ward

St. Mary's ward

The Liberal Democrat candidate defected to the Labour Party two days before the election.

Stretford ward

Timperley ward

Urmston ward

Village ward

References

 Official Trafford Council Election page

2012 English local elections
2012
2010s in Greater Manchester